Saint Marina  may refer to:
Saint Margaret of Antioch, also known as Saint Margaret the Virgin, Saint Marina the Martyr or Agia Marina by the Orthodox Church
Saint Marina of Aguas Santas (119-139), virgin and martyr of Balcagia (current Baiona, Spain)
Saint Marina the Monk, also known as Marina the Syrian, lived in the Monastery of Qannoubine, in the Holy Valley, Lebanon; venerated by Maronite Church
Venerable Marina de Escobar

See also
 Santa Marina (disambiguation)